Sheikh Russel Cantonment is a Bangladeshi military cantonment near  Padma Bridge in Munshiganj and Shariatpur Districts, Bangladesh. The cantonment has been named after Sheikh Russel, younger brother of Bangladesh Prime minister Sheikh Hasina Wazed. It has been established to ensure overall security of the bridge as it will be the main link of the highway connectivity between South Bengal and  other parts of Bangladesh.

Units
 99th Composite Brigade
 1x Mechanized Infantry Battalion
 1x Bangladesh Infantry Regiment
 1x Riverine Engineers Battalion
 1x Military Engineers Service (MES)

See also
 Padma River
 Jamuna Cantonment

References

Cantonments of Bangladesh
Padma Bridge